The 2001 Czech Figure Skating Championships were held in Mladá Boleslav between December 15 and 17, 2000. Skaters competed in the disciplines of men's singles, ladies singles, pair skating, and ice dancing.

Results

Men

Ladies

Pairs

Ice dancing

External links
 results

2000 in figure skating
Czech Figure Skating Championships, 2001
Czech Figure Skating Championships
2001 in Czech sport